Māngarongaro may be,

Mangarongaro atoll
Mangarongaro language